Körmend is a district in south-western part of Vas County. Körmend is also the name of the town where the district seat is found. The district is located in the Western Transdanubia Statistical Region.

Geography 
Körmend District borders with Szombathely District to the north, Vasvár District to the east, Zalaegerszeg District and Lenti District (Zala County) to the south, Slovenia, Szentgotthárd District and the Austrian state of Burgenland to the west. The number of the inhabited places in Körmend District is 46.

Municipalities 
The district has 2 towns and 44 villages.
(ordered by population, as of 1 January 2013)

The bolded municipalities are cities.

Demographics

In 2011, it had a population of 27,177 and the population density was 44/km².

Ethnicity
Besides the Hungarian majority, the main minorities are the German (approx. 300) and Roma (250).

Total population (2011 census): 27,177
Ethnic groups (2011 census): Identified themselves: 24,347 persons:
Hungarians: 23,538 (96.68%)
Germans: 313 (1.29%)
Gypsies: 259 (1.06%)
Others and indefinable: 231 (0.95%)
Approx. 3,000 persons in Körmend District did not declare their ethnic group at the 2011 census.

Religion
Religious adherence in the county according to 2011 census:

Catholic – 15,792 (Roman Catholic – 15,766; Greek Catholic – 21);
Reformed – 2,871;
Evangelical – 1,447;
other religions – 210; 
Non-religious – 1,091; 
Atheism – 131;
Undeclared – 5,635.

See also
List of cities and towns in Hungary

References

External links
 Postal codes of the Körmend District

Districts in Vas County